The men's 5000 metres in speed skating at the 1994 Winter Olympics took place on 13 February, at the Hamar Olympic Hall. 32 competitors from 17 nations participated in the competition.

Records
Prior to this competition, the existing world and Olympic records were as follows:

The following new world and olympic records was set during this competition.

Results

References

Men's speed skating at the 1994 Winter Olympics